Aluvihare is a suburb of Matale, Central Province of Sri Lanka.

The suburb is situated on the Kandy-Jaffna highway (A9).

It was founded by King Devanampiyatissa, around 300 B.C. but did not receive the name Aluvihare until a later date.
The Aluvihare family originated from the area, an important family responsible for looking after the Aluvihare Rock Temple, and thus serving the Buddhist community in Sri Lanka.

Today, Aluvihare is a popular attraction to both tourists and Buddhists wanting to visit the Aluvihare Rock Temple.

See also
 Aluvihare Rock Temple
 Nalanda Gedige
 List of settlements in Central Province, Sri Lanka

References

Populated places in Matale District